Amdjarass or Am-Djarass is the capital city of the Ennedi-Est Region in northern Chad. It is also the capital of the second level administrative division, the Am-Djarass department. It is the largest city in the region and the fourth largest in Saharan (Northern) Chad.

Despite formerly being an isolated Saharan oasis, its population as of the 2009 census is 20,850, and has grown considerably from just 657 residents in the 1993 census. 

The city has its own airport. The city is presently mapped in OpenStreetMap, but many atlases do not put this city on the map. 

On July 3, 2015, Chadian president Idriss Deby visited Amdjarass. It is the city in which he would be buried 6 years later. The town has a hotel called the Toumai Hotel Amdjarass and the town has a fortress. There is a boomerang-shaped rock with the town's name at the entrance to the town. The mayor is Ismael Miss.

References
 
 
 
 

Populated places in Chad
Ennedi-Est Region
Oases of Chad